SportsTalk Live may refer to

 An American TV series in California, SportsTalk Live (NBC Sports Bay Area)
 The TV series of the same name on NBC Sports Washington
 The TV series of the same name on NBC Sports Chicago
 The related podcast in Chicago, SportsTalk Live Podcast

See also
 NBC SportsTalk, a daily U.S. show on NBCSN
 Talksport, a UK radio station